Star Wars: Rebellion may refer to:

 Star Wars: Rebellion (video game), a 1998 strategy game also known as Supremacy
 Star Wars: Rebellion (comics), a 2006 comic book series
 Star Wars: Rebellion (board game), a 2016 strategy board game